The 2001 Finnish Figure Skating Championships took place between January 6 and 7, 2001 in Mikkeli. Skaters competed in the disciplines of men's singles and women's singles on the senior and junior levels, and pair skating and ice dancing on the junior level. The event was used to help determine the Finnish team to the 2001 European Championships.

Senior results

Men

Ladies

External links
 results

Finnish Figure Skating Championships, 2001
Finnish Figure Skating Championships
2001 in Finnish sport